Bruce J. Walker is an American engineer, lawyer, and government official who serves as the Assistant Secretary of Energy (Electricity Delivery and Energy Reliability). Prior to assuming his current role, he founded Modern Energy Insights, Inc., which specializes in evaluating risk for utilities' electric infrastructure. Walker previously worked at National Grid as the vice president of asset strategy and policy and at Consolidated Edison, where he last held the position of director of corporate emergency management and served on the biological chemical weapons response team. He has served as a member of the United States Department of Energy's Electricity Advisory Committee. Walker co-founded the Global Smart Grid Federation. He has also served as the deputy county executive for Putnam County, New York, and as the acting energy sector chief for the Hudson Valley Infragard.

References

Living people
Manhattan College alumni
Pace University School of Law alumni
21st-century American lawyers
21st-century American engineers
Trump administration personnel
Year of birth missing (living people)
United States Department of Energy officials